Piptostigma calophyllum is a species of plant in the Annonaceae family. It is found in Cameroon and Gabon. Its natural habitat is subtropical or tropical moist lowland forests. It is threatened by habitat loss. It is a tree and grows primarily in the wet tropical biome.

References

Annonaceae
Vulnerable plants
Flora of Cameroon
Flora of Gabon
Taxonomy articles created by Polbot